The South Korea national badminton team represents South Korea in international badminton team competitions. The team emerged as the Sudirman Cup champion in 1991, 1993, 2003, and 2017, also won world women's team championships in the 2010 and repeated this feat in the 2022 Uber Cups.

Participation in BWF competitions

Thomas Cup 

Uber Cup

Sudirman Cup

Participation in Badminton Asia Championships

Men's team

Women's team

Mixed team

Famous players

Men
Lee Hyun-il
Park Sung-hwan
Shon Wan-ho
Jung Jae-sung
Lee Yong-dae
Ko Sung-hyun
Yoo Yeon-seong
Kim Sa-Rang
Kim Ki-jung
Shin Baek-cheol
Seo Seung-jae
Choi Sol-gyu

Women
Bae Seung-hee
Lee Yun-hwa
Sung Ji-hyun
Bae Youn-joo
Ha Jung-eun
Lee Kyung-won
Kim Min-jung
Jung Kyung-eun
Lee Hyo-jung
Kim Ha-na
Chae Yu-jung

References 

Badminton
National badminton teams
Badminton in South Korea